Cros-de-Montvert is a commune in the Cantal department in south-central France. The commune has one known church.

Geography
The river Maronne forms the commune's northwestern border.

Demography

See also
Communes of the Cantal department

References

Communes of Cantal